Nomia universitatis is a species of bee in the family Halictidae. It is native to the continental United States.

References

universitatis
Insects described in 1908